Gmina Białośliwie is a rural gmina (administrative district) in Piła County, Greater Poland Voivodeship, in west-central Poland.

Villages
Gmina Białośliwie contains the villages and settlements of Białośliwie, Dębówko Nowe, Dębówko Stare, Dworzakowo, Krostkowo, Nieżychówko, Nieżychowo, Pobórka Mała, Pobórka Wielka, and Tomaszewo.

Neighbouring gminas
Gmina Białośliwie is bordered by the gminas of Miasteczko Krajeńskie, Szamocin, Wyrzysk, and Wysoka.

References
Polish official population figures 2006

Bialosliwie
Piła County